Astartidae is a family of bivalves related in the order Carditida.

Astartidae taxonomy
Astarte J. Sowerby, 1816
Astarte acuticostata J. G. Jeffreys, 1881
Astarte arctica (J. E. Gray, 1824)
Astarte bennetti Dall, 1903
Astarte borealis (Schumacher, 1817) – northern astarte
Astarte castanea (Say, 1822) – chestnut astarte
Astarte compacta Carpenter, 1864
Astarte crebricostata (Da Costa, 1778)
Astarte crenata (J. E. Gray, 1824)
Astarte elliptica (T. Brown, 1827) – elliptical astarte
Astarte esquimalti (Baird, 1863)
Astarte filatovae Habe, 1964
Astarte globula Dall, 1886
Astarte laurentiana
Astarte liogona Dall, 1903
Astarte mirabilis (Dall, 1871)
Astarte montagui (Dillwyn, 1817)
Astarte nana Dall, 1886
Astarte polaris Dall, 1903
Astarte quadrans Gould, 1841
Astarte smithii Dall, 1886
Astarte subaequilatera Sowerby, 1854 – lentil astarte
Astarte sulcata (Decosta, 1778)
Astarte triangularis
Astarte undata Gould, 1841 – waved astarte
Astarte vernicosa Dall, 1903
Astarte willetti Dall, 1917
Digitaria S. Wood, 1853
Digitaria digitaria (Linnaeus, 1758)
Goodallia Turton, 1822
Goodallia triangularis (Montagu, 1803)

References

 
Bivalve families